Tianjin Port (Group) Company (TPG) is the main operator of the Port of Tianjin. It was established in 2004 by the incorporation of the Tianjin Port Authority, part of the process in China of making port authorities into autonomous corporations. It has been a top 500 company in China since 2004.

References

Companies based in Tianjin
Chinese companies established in 2004
Port operating companies
Transport companies established in 2004